The 2022–23 SMU Mustangs men's basketball team represented Southern Methodist University during the 2022–23 NCAA Division I men's basketball season. The Mustangs were led by first-year head coach Rob Lanier and played their home games at Moody Coliseum on their campus in University Park, Texas as members of the American Athletic Conference.

Previous season
The Mustangs finished the 2021–22 season 24–9, 13–4 in AAC play to finish in second place. They defeated Tulsa in the quarterfinals of the AAC tournament before losing to Memphis in the semifinals. They received an at-large bid to the National Invitation Tournament as a No. 1 seed. They defeated Nichols in the first round before losing to Washington State in the second round.

On March 22, 2022, head coach Tim Jankovich announced his retirement from coaching. On March 27, the school named Georgia State head coach Rob Lanier the team's new head coach.

Offseason

Departures

Incoming Transfers

2022 Recruiting class
There were no incoming recruits for the class of 2022.

Roster

Schedule and results

|-
!colspan=12 style=|Exhibition

|-
!colspan=12 style=| Non-conference regular season

|-
!colspan=12 style=| AAC regular season

|-
!colspan=12 style=| AAC tournament

Source

References

SMU Mustangs men's basketball seasons
Smu